Rabbi Jason Gary Klein became the first openly gay man chosen to head a national rabbinical association of one of the major Jewish denominations in the United States in 2013, when he was chosen as president of the Reconstructionist Rabbinical Association. He was also the first Hillel director to hold the presidency, the chief volunteer position of the organization. As of his election as president, Klein was the executive director of Hillel at UMBC, the University of Maryland, Baltimore County, a post he held from 2006 until 2013. He served as president of the Reconstructionist Rabbinical Association for two years—until 2015.  As of July 2013 he became the Director of the Center for Jewish Life at JCP Downtown, the Jewish Community Project of Lower Manhattan, where he served until 2018.

Since 2018, Klein has served on the clergy and executive team of Temple Israel, Minneapolis, as the Director of Lifelong Learning at Temple Israel, Minneapolis.

Klein grew up in East Brunswick and Montclair, both in New Jersey, graduated from Columbia University in 1997, and was ordained by the Reconstructionist Rabbinical College in 2002. He lives in the East Isles neighborhood of Minneapolis.

Writing
 "Hanukkah" in A Guide to Jewish Practice: Volume 2 -- Shabbat and Holidays (Teutsch), 2014 
 "Parashat Bo" in Torah Queeries (Drinkwater et al.), 2009
 "Queer Ritual on Campus" with Rabbi Mychal Copeland in The Hillel LGBTQ Resource Guide, 2007

Teaching, media, and public appearances
 Greetings, Inauguration of Rabbi Deborah Waxman, 2014
 Contributor, My Fellow American (is Muslim) Project,
 "Beshalach," Torah Talk, Jewish Journal
 Park Avenue Podcast, "How We Talk About Judaism" pilot
 Selected Podcasts, Temple Talks

References 

Living people
LGBT rabbis
LGBT people from New Jersey
American Reconstructionist rabbis
21st-century American Jews
1975 births